Vertfee Yaita (ヴェルフェ矢板, Vu~erufe Yaita) is a Japanese football club from Yaita, in Tochigi Prefecture. They played in the second division of Kantō Soccer League, part of Japanese Regional Leagues.

History
The club name "Vertfee" is a combination of two words which mean "green" (Vert) and "fairy" (fee) in French.

Current squad
Updated to 17 August 2022.

League record

References

External links
Official Site

Football clubs in Japan
Sports teams in Tochigi Prefecture
1978 establishments in Japan